Locked Lips is a 1920 American drama film directed by William C. Dowlan and featuring Tsuru Aoki, Stanhope Wheatcroft, and Magda Lane. It is not known whether the film currently survives.

Plot
As described in a film magazine, Blossom (Aoki), a Japanese orphan girl and a teacher at a native school in Hawaii, finds Parker (Wheatcroft), an American and a derelict, attempting to rob her cottage. She sympathizes with him and partially reclaims him, and then they are married. Park fleas to Honolulu and then to the United States, leaving behind indications that he drowned. Blossom comes to the United States and gets a position as a lady's maid to Audry (Lane). On the day that a baby is born to Audry, her husband Harvey Stanwood returns home, and Blossom recognizes in him her former husband Park. He, aware of Blossom's identity and fearing exposure, attempts to kill her with poison incense, but he falls victim to it instead. Blossom returns to her Japanese lover Komo and they find happiness.

Cast
Tsuru Aoki as Lotus Blossom
Stanhope Wheatcroft as Park, aka Harvey Stanwood
Magda Lane as Audrey Stanwood
Yutaka Abe as Komo (as Jack Abbe)

References

External links 

 

Universal Pictures films
American silent feature films
American black-and-white films
Silent American drama films
1920 drama films
1920 films
Films directed by William C. Dowlan
1920s American films